Asteelflash Group is a French multinational electronics contract manufacturing company specializing in printed circuit board assembly and also offering design and aftermarket services.
 
Headquartered in Neuilly-Plaisance, France, it is the second largest electronics manufacturing services(EMS) company in Europe and ranks among top 20 worldwide with manufacturing operations in 18 countries, totaling approximately 2 million square feet and 5,700 employees.

History

In 1999, the company was founded in Paris, France as Asteel by Gilles Benhamou. The EMS company experienced rapid growth through acquisitions. Asteel then extended its operations into North Africa and Europe and acquired new premises in both Tunisia (in Mégrine and Fouchana) and the United Kingdom (in Bedford, England).

In 2008, Asteel acquired Flash Electronics, an American EMS company founded in 1994, and developed it into a multinational company, operating since then under the name Asteelflash. In so doing, the company reinforced its global footprint with new facilities in the USA (in Fremont, California) and in China (in Suzhou, Jiangsu).

In 2012, Asteelflash acquired American Catalyst Manufacturing Services, Inc. with plants in Raleigh, North Carolina and in Tijuana, Baja California, Mexico. Hoping to establish a permanent foothold in the European market, Asteelflash acquired French TES Electronic Solutions in 2011 and German EN ElectronicNetwork in 2012.

Ranking No. 2 in Europe and among top 20 worldwide, Asteelflash's competitors are industry heavyweights such as: Flextronics (Singapore), Jabil (United States) or Foxconn (Taiwan), Benchmark (United States), Celestica (Canada), Plexus (United States) and Zollner (Germany).

Market segments
 Industrial - This segment accounts for about 30% of Asteelflash Group's revenue.
 Data processing - This segment accounts for about 28% of Asteelflash Group's revenue.
 Defense and aerospace - This segment accounts for about 4% of Asteelflash Group's revenue.
 Transportation - This segment accounts for about 15% of Asteelflash Group's revenue.
 Energy management - This segment accounts for about 18% of Asteelflash Group's revenue.
 Medical - This segment accounts for about 5% of Asteelflash Group's revenue.

Asteelflash has manufacturing operations in eight countries on four continents, totaling 18 plants, approximately 2 million square feet manufacturing surface and +6,000 employees.

Asteelflash Group demarcated its global footprint into four geographical divisions, listed below.

AMERICAS
300,000 ft2, 400 employees

 United States
 Fremont (California) : 220,000 ft2, 250 employees
 Mexico
 Tijuana (Baja California): 80,000 ft2, 150 employees

West EMEA 
610,000 ft², 2,044 employees

 France (393,000 ft2, 800 employees)
 AF Atlantique : Langon (Ille-et-Vilaine)
 AF Normandie : Déville-lès-Rouen (Seine-Maritime)
 AF Est : Duttlenheim (Bas-Rhin)
 AF Lorraine : Cleurie (Vosges)
 AF Île-de-France : Mercin-et-Vaux (Aisne)
 United Kingdom
 Bedford (Bedfordshire, England) : 55,000 ft2, 104 employees
Tunisia
 AF La Soukra :  162,000 ft², 1,140 employees

East EMEA
329,000 ft2, 700 employees
 Germany
 AF Bonn : Bornheim (North Rhine-Westphalia)
 AF Design Solutions Hamburg: Hamburg (Hamburg)
 AF Hersfeld : Bad Hersfeld (Hesse)
 AF Eberbach : Eberbach (Baden-Württemberg)
 Czech Republic
 Pilsen (Plzeň)

APAC
 China
Suzhou (Jiangsu) : 151,000 ft2, 1 900 employees

References

External links
Syndicat National des Entreprises de Sous-traitance Electronique

Electronics companies of France
Manufacturing companies based in Paris
Multinational companies headquartered in France
Electronics companies established in 1999
French companies established in 1999
French brands